Binna Choi (born 1977) is a South Korean curator and the director of Casco Art Institute: Working for the Commons.

Education and career 
Choi completed her curatorial studies at the De Appel in Amsterdam 2004, after graduation she joined BAK, basis voor actuele kunst in Utrecht as a curator until She joined Casco Art Institute: Working for the Commons in 2008 as a director. Choi has been part of the faculty of the Dutch Art Institute / Masters of Fine Arts Program in Arnhem and is a founding member of Electric Palm Tree.

Exhibition 
 2014 New Habits, group exhibition : Ayreen Anastas and Rene Gabri, Andrea Büttner, Jesko Fezer and Andreas Müller with Maximilian Weydringer, Andrea Fraser, Natascha Sadr Haghighian, Tehching Hsieh, Ienke Kastelein, Sung Hwan Kim and dogr aka David Michael DiGregorio, Annette Krauss, Aimée Zito Lema, Wietske Maas, Christian Nyampeta and Yvonne Rainer.
 2014 In the Year of the Quiet Sun, The Otolith Group
 2014 Cultivate or Revolutionize? Life between Apartment and Farmland, Symposium
 2013 Japan Syndrome - Utrecht Version with Tadasu Takamine
 2012 I Can't Work Like This
 2012 *Latent Stare*, David Bennewith
 2011 seeing studies: Natascha Sadr Haghighian & Ashkan Sepahvand
 2010 Lying Freely with Ruth Buchanan

Publications 
 2014 Grand Domestic Revolution Handbook (editor)
 2011 Casco Issues XII: Generous Structures (author)
 2011 Circular Facts (editor)
 2015 Cluster: Dialectionary (co-author)
 2007 Haegue Yang: Community of Absence(Author)

See also 

Casco Art Institute: Working for the Commons

References 

Dutch art curators
South Korean curators
1977 births
Date of birth missing (living people)
Place of birth missing (living people)
Living people
Dutch women curators
South Korean women curators